Vadzim Mikalayevich Straltsou (Łacinka: Vadzim Mikałajevič Stralcoŭ; born 30 April 1986) is a Belarusian weightlifter. Competing in men's 94 kg, he is the 2015 World champion and 2016 Olympic silver medalist.

Career 
In 2006, Straltsou dominated the 85 kg class by winning the gold medal at the Junior World Weightlifting Championships in Hangzhou, China. He took bronze at the 2007 World Championships in Chiang Mai.

Straltsou represented Belarus at the 2008 Summer Olympics in Beijing, competing in the men's light heavyweight category along with his compatriot Andrei Rybakou, who eventually won the silver medal. He did not finish the event, after failing to lift a snatch of 170 kg in three attempts.

Competing in men's 94 kg, Straltsou won gold at the 2015 World Championships in Houston. He was awarded the silver medal in the men's -94 kg event at the 2016 Summer Olympics in Rio de Janeiro.

References

External links
NBC Olympics Profile

Belarusian male weightlifters
1986 births
Living people
World Weightlifting Championships medalists
Olympic weightlifters of Belarus
Weightlifters at the 2008 Summer Olympics
Weightlifters at the 2016 Summer Olympics
People from Mogilev
Medalists at the 2016 Summer Olympics
Olympic silver medalists for Belarus
Olympic medalists in weightlifting
European Weightlifting Championships medalists
Sportspeople from Mogilev Region